Kahak Rural District is a rural district (dehestan) in Kahak District, Qom County, Qom Province, Iran. At the 2006 census, its population was 9,590, in 2,696 families.  The rural district has 10 villages.

References 

Rural Districts of Qom Province
Qom County